Bor is a rural locality (a village) in Semizerye Rural Settlement, Kaduysky District, Vologda Oblast, Russia. The population was 11 as of 2002.

Geography 
Bor is located 37 km northwest of Kaduy (the district's administrative centre) by road. Maza is the nearest rural locality.

References 

Rural localities in Kaduysky District